Let It Go is the ninth studio album by American country music artist Tim McGraw. Released on March 27, 2007, it was his first studio album in two and a half years. Let It Go entered the U.S. Billboard 200 at number one with sales of 325,000. The album has produced seven Top 20 singles on the Billboard Hot Country Songs charts, including a number one; one of those seven songs was only included on later issues of the album. Of all McGraw's albums, this one has produced the most singles in his career.

Content
The first single from the album, "Last Dollar (Fly Away)" (written by Big Kenny of Big & Rich), reached the top of the country charts in early 2007, giving McGraw his first number one hit since "Back When" in late 2004. Following it was "I Need You", a duet with his wife Faith Hill. This song peaked at #8. Shortly after the latter was released, McGraw charted with a live rendition of the song "If You're Reading This". He performed that song live at the Academy of Country Music awards in May 2007. A month after this song entered the charts, the album was re-issued with "If You're Reading This" added to the track listing. Afterwards, that song was later officially issued as the album's third single and reached #3 on the country charts.

"If You're Reading This" was followed in late 2007 by "Suspicions", a cover of Eddie Rabbitt's number one hit from 1979. However, McGraw's version became the second Top 40 hit of all his career to miss the Top 10 by peaking at #12 on Hot Country Songs. Following that song were "Kristofferson" and the title track in 2008; the former also failed to make the Top Ten by at #16 while the latter went to #2 in early December. The seventh single, "Nothin' to Die For", was released in January 2009. It entered the Hot Country Songs chart as an album cut at #57 in late December before its official release that month.

The song "Shotgun Rider" is not to be confused with another song with the same name which McGraw recorded on his 2014 album, Sundown Heaven Town. This song, written by Marv Green, Hillary Lindsey and Troy Verges, was released by McGraw as the latter album's third single in 2014, and became a number one song for him that year.

Track listing

Personnel
Tim McGraw & the Dancehall Doctors
 Tim McGraw – lead vocals
 Jeff McMahon – acoustic piano, Rhodes, Wurlitzer electric piano, synthesizers, Hammond B3 organ
 Denny Hemingson – electric guitar, steel guitar
 Bob Minner – acoustic guitar
 Darran Smith – electric guitar, additional acoustic guitar (13)
 Deano Brown – fiddle, mandolin
 John Marcus – bass
 Billy Mason – drums
 David Dunkley – percussion

Additional Musician
 Byron Gallimore – synthesizers (8, 12), acoustic guitar (12)

Background Vocals
 Last Dollar Singers (1)
 Russell Terrell (1-5)
 Greg Barnhill (2-5, 7-10, 12)
 Wes Hightower (6)
 Faith Hill (13), lead vocals (11)

Production
 Byron Gallimore – producer, mixing 
 Tim McGraw – producer, mixing 
 Darran Smith – producer 
 Missi Gallimore – A&R direction
 Julian King – tracking engineer 
 David Bryant – assistant engineer (1-12)
 John Netti – assistant engineer (1, 2, 5, 6, 9, 10, 11)
 Lowell Reynolds – assistant engineer (1, 2, 5, 6, 9, 10, 11)
 David Robinson – assistant engineer (1, 2, 5, 6, 9, 10, 11)
 Bryan Graban – assistant engineer (3, 4, 7, 8, 12)
 Todd Schall – assistant engineer (3, 4, 7, 8, 12)
 Jesse Chrisman – additional recording, Pro Tools engineer, mix assistant 
 Jason Gantt – additional recording, Pro Tools engineer 
 Jed Hackett – additional recording,  Pro Tools engineer 
 Sara Lesher – additional recording,  Pro Tools engineer, mix assistant 
 Erik Lutkins – additional recording,  Pro Tools engineer, mix assistant
 Heath Stimmel – additional recording 
 Adam Ayan – mastering 
 Ann Callis – production assistant 
 Glenn Sweitzer – art direction, package design 
 Tony Duran – cover photography, other photography 
 Danny Clinch – other photography

Studios
 Recorded and overdubbed at Essential Sound Studios (Houston, Texas) and Ocean Way (Nashville, Tennessee)
 Mixed and edited at Essential Sound Studios
 Mastered at Gateway Mastering (Portland, Maine)

Chart performance
Let It Go entered the U.S. Billboard 200 and the Top Country Albums charts at #1. This became McGraw's fourth #1 Billboard 200 and eleventh #1 Top Country Albums release.

Weekly charts

Year-end charts

Sales and certifications

Singles

References

External links
 

2007 albums
Tim McGraw albums
Curb Records albums
Albums produced by Byron Gallimore
Albums with cover art by Tony Duran
Albums produced by Tim McGraw